GGD may refer to:

 Generalized Gaussian distribution
 Gugadj language, spoken in Australia
 Goo Goo Dolls, an American rock band
 Municipal Health Service (GGD), decentralized public health agencies in the Netherlands